Jon Šporn (born 22 May 1997) is a Slovenian football midfielder who plays for NK Celje.

Honours
Mura
Slovenian Cup: 2019–20

References

External links
PrvaLiga profile 

1997 births
Living people
Sportspeople from Celje
Slovenian footballers
Slovenian expatriate footballers
Association football midfielders
NK Celje players
NK Drava Ptuj (2004) players
NŠ Mura players
SV Horn players
Slovenian PrvaLiga players
Slovenian Second League players
2. Liga (Austria) players
Slovenian expatriate sportspeople in Austria
Expatriate footballers in Austria
Slovenia youth international footballers